The Fédération Internationale de l'Automobile (FIA) is an association established on 20 June 1904 to represent the interests of motoring organisations and motor car users. It is the governing body for many auto racing events, including Formula One. The FIA also promotes road safety around the world.

Headquartered at 8 Place de la Concorde, Paris, with offices in Geneva and Valleiry, the FIA consists of 246 member organisations in 145 countries worldwide. Its current president is Mohammed bin Sulayem. The FIA is generally known by its French name or initials, even in non-French-speaking countries, but is occasionally rendered as International Automobile Federation.

Its most prominent role is in the licensing and sanctioning of Formula One, World Rally Championship, World Endurance Championship, World Touring Car Cup, World Rallycross Championship, Formula E, and various other forms of racing. The FIA along with the Fédération Internationale de Motocyclisme (FIM) also certify land speed record attempts. The International Olympic Committee provisionally recognized the federation in 2011, and granted full recognition in 2013.

History 
The Association Internationale des Automobile Clubs Reconnus (AIACR, English: 'International Association of Recognized Automobile Clubs') was founded in Paris on 20 June 1904, as an association of national motor clubs. The association was designed to represent the interests of motor car users, as well as to oversee the burgeoning international motor sport scene. In 1922, the AIACR delegated the organisation of automobile racing to the Commission Sportive Internationale (CSI), which would set the regulations for international Grand Prix motor racing. The European Drivers' Championship was introduced in 1931, a title awarded to the driver with the best results in the selected Grands Prix. Upon the resumption of motor racing after the Second World War, the AIACR was renamed the Fédération Internationale de l'Automobile. The FIA established a number of new racing categories, among them Formulas One and Two, and created the first World Championship, the Formula One World Drivers' Championship, in 1950.

The CSI determined the regulations and calendar of the major international championships, such as the Formula One World Championship, World Sportscar Championship and European Rally Championship. Meanwhile, the organisers of the individual races (for example local or national clubs) were responsible for accepting entries, paying prize money, and the general running of each event. In Formula One, this led to tension between the teams, which formed themselves into the Formula One Constructors Association (FOCA) founded in 1974, event organisers and the CSI. The FIA and CSI were largely amateur organisations, and FOCA under the control of Bernie Ecclestone began to take charge of various aspects of organising the events, as well as setting terms with race organisers for the arrival of teams and the amount of prize money. This led to the FIA President Prince Metternich attempting to reassert its authority by appointing Jean-Marie Balestre as the head of the CSI in 1978, who promptly reformed the committee into the autonomous Fédération Internationale du Sport Automobile (FISA).

Under Balestre's leadership FISA and the manufacturer-backed teams became involved in a dispute with FOCA (named the "FISA–FOCA war"). The conflict saw several races being cancelled or boycotted, and large-scale disagreement over the technical regulations and their enforcement. The dispute and the Concorde Agreement that was written to end it, would have significant ramifications for the FIA. The agreement led to FOCA acquiring commercial rights over Formula One, while FISA and the FIA would have control over sport's regulations. FOCA chief Bernie Ecclestone became an FIA Vice-President with control over promoting the FIA's World Championships, while FOCA legal advisor and former March Engineering manager Max Mosley would end up becoming FISA President in 1991. Mosley succeeded Balestre as President of the FIA in 1993 and restructured the organisation, dissolving FISA and placing motor racing under the direct management of the FIA.

Following the 1994 San Marino Grand Prix, which saw the deaths of Ayrton Senna and Roland Ratzenberger, the FIA formed an Expert Advisory Safety Committee to research and improve safety in motor racing. Chaired by Formula One medical chief Professor Sid Watkins, the committee worked with the Motor Industry Research Association to strengthen the crash resistance of cars and the restraint systems and to improve drivers' personal safety. The recommendations of the committee led to significantly more stringent crash tests for racing vehicles, new safety standards for helmets and race suits, and the eventual introduction of the HANS device as compulsory in all international racing series. The committee also worked on improving circuit safety. This led to a number of changes at motor racing circuits around the world, and the improvement of crash barriers and trackside medical procedures.

The FIA was a founder member of the European New Car Assessment Programme, a car safety programme that crash-tests new models and publishes safety reports on vehicles. Mosley was the first chairman of the organisation. The FIA later helped establish the Latin NCAP and Global NCAP.

The FIA announced in 2022 the appointment of its first ever CEO, Natalie Robyn.

European Commission investigation 
The Competition Directorate of the European Commission and the FIA were involved in a dispute over the commercial administration of motorsport during the 1990s. The Competition Commissioner, Karel Van Miert had received a number of complaints from television companies and motorsport promoters in 1997 that the FIA had been abusing its position as motorsport's governing body. Van Miert's initial inquiry had not concluded by 1999, which resulted in the FIA suing the European Commission, alleging that the delay was causing damaging uncertainty, and successfully receiving an apology from the Commission over the leaking of documents relating to the case. Mario Monti took over as Commissioner in 1999, and the European Commission opened a formal investigation into the FIA. The Commission alleged a number of breaches of European competition law, centred around the FIA's administration of licences required to participate in motorsport and the control of television rights of the motorsport events it authorised. In order to compete in events the FIA authorised, the competitor had to apply for a licence, which prohibited licensees from entering a series not controlled by the FIA. This provision, which also applied to racing circuits and promoters, prevented rival championships competing against the FIA championships by restricting their access to facilities, drivers, and vehicle manufacturers. In addition, the FIA also claimed the television rights to all international motorsport events, which were then transferred to International Sportsworld Communicators, a company controlled by Ecclestone. This meant organisers were forced into having their championships promoted by the same company that managed the affairs of other motorsport events, a potential conflict of interest. The combination of these requirements meant Ecclestone's Formula One Administration, which now controlled Formula One's commercial rights, was protected from competition from any rival championships.

The investigation was closed in 2001 after the FIA and FOA agreed to a number of conditions. In order to fairly regulate all international motorsport, the FIA agreed to limit its role to that of a sporting regulator, and would sell the commercial rights to its championships, including Formula One. This was to prevent a conflict of interest between the FIA's regulatory role and any commercial advantages it may gain from the success of certain championships. The FIA could no longer prevent non-FIA administered events from being established, neither could it use its powers to prevent competition to Formula One. Ecclestone and FOA would no longer handle the commercial rights to other motorsport events outside of Formula One. Ecclestone had sold the ISC company, which now only controlled the rights to rallying, and would stand down from his role as an FIA Vice-President. As a result of this ruling, the FIA sold the commercial rights to Formula One to the Formula One Group for 100 years for $360 million.

Later Mosley years 
Mosley was elected unopposed to his third term as president in 2001, the first election which reduced the term from five to four years. The FIA also moved back to Paris, having been based in Geneva (outside the EU) for the previous two years during the European Commission's investigation.

The FIA Foundation was established in 2001 as the FIA's charitable arm. The Foundation received a US$300 million grant from the sale of Formula One's rights to fund research into road safety, the environmental impact of motoring, and to support sustainable motoring. In 2004 the FIA and the Foundation established the FIA Institute for Motor Sport Safety, which brought together the various safety research groups into one organisation. The Make Roads Safe campaign was set up in 2006 by the FIA Foundation, targeting the creation of safe roads across the world.

During the 2000s the FIA and its president became increasingly embroiled in controversy over Formula One, while facing threats from teams to establish a breakaway series. A grouping of the car manufacturers involved in F1, the Grand Prix Manufacturers Association, proposed a new world championship, which would allow them greater control over the regulations and revenue distribution. A new Concorde Agreement eventually ended the threat, but the breakaway series would resurface during each dispute between the FIA, teams and the Formula One Group. The FIA's handling of the tyre situation at the 2005 United States Grand Prix was criticised. Mosley had refused any modification to the circuit or the holding of a non-championship event in place of the Grand Prix, having stated that running on an untested circuit was unsafe. The FIA also threatened to punish the teams who withdrew from the event, but later cleared the teams of any wrongdoing.

Having again been re-elected unopposed in 2005, Mosley faced his first leadership challenge in a vote of confidence called in June 2008. The vote was in response to allegations concerning Mosley's sex life published by the British media. Mosley won the vote by 103 votes in support to 55 against, though he continued to face criticism from several motoring clubs and motorsport figures. In mid-2009, the FIA and the newly formed Formula One Teams Association disagreed over the pending implementation of a budget cap for the 2010 season. The teams again threatened a breakaway championship, with the FIA in response opening an entry process for new teams. The dispute also focused on a lack of confidence in Mosley's control over the sport, and there was a stand-off until Ecclestone negotiated a settlement to establish a new Concorde Agreement. In return for the teams joining the championship and ending the dispute, the budget cap would be replaced by a series of cost-cutting measures, and Mosley agreed to stand down at the end of his term in 2009.

Todt presidency 
Former Scuderia Ferrari boss Jean Todt was elected the new President of the FIA in 2009, beating former World Rally champion Ari Vatanen. He was re-elected for two more 4-year terms, then stepped down on 17 December 2021, succeeded by Mohammed Ben Sulayem.

2022 ban of Russian and Belarusian teams and competitions

In response to the 2022 Russian invasion of Ukraine, the FIA banned Russia and Belarus teams, and banned the holding of competitions in Russia or Belarus. It also excluded Russian and Belarusian FIA members from their roles as elected officers or commission members, and banned FIA grants to Russian and Belarusian members. Individual Russia and Belarus competitors were allowed to enter races as neutrals, without their national symbols, flags, colors, and anthems. The FIA cancelled the 2022 edition of the Russian Grand Prix in Sochi, initially scheduled for 25 September. The FIA also terminated the Russian contract to host the race.

Event history 

The true history of Formula One began in 1946 with the Fédération Internationale de l'Automobile's (FIA's) standardisation of rules. Then in 1950, the FIA organised the first World Championship for Drivers. From 1958, a Constructors Championship title was introduced.

The World Sportscar Championship was created in 1953, and was the first points series for sports car racing in the world. The championship was solely for manufacturers up to 1981. In 1981, a Drivers Championship title was introduced, and in 1985, the manufacturers title was replaced by a Teams Championship.

In 1973, the FIA organised the first World Rally Championship beginning with the 42nd Rally of Monte-Carlo to replace the International Championship for Manufacturers. In 1977 and 1978 an FIA Cup for Drivers was included before a Driver's Championship title was introduced in 1979.

In 1987, the FIA sanctioned the first World Touring Car Championship. Initially a one-off series, the title was revived in 2005 and discontinued at the end of 2017.

After the 1992 season the World Sportscar Championship was cancelled and dissolved.

In 1993, the National Hot Rod Association was officially recognised by the FIA World Motor Sport Council and the FIA Drag Racing Commission was formed. The FISA was dissolved, and its activities placed directly under the FIA.

In 2010, the SRO Group introduced the FIA GT1 World Championship, which was a championship consisting of one-hour sprint races.

After the Automobile Club de l'Ouest (ACO) successfully organised the Intercontinental Le Mans Cup (ILMC) in 2010 and 2011, the FIA and ACO organised together the rebirth of the World Sportscar Championship from 2012 onward, now known as the FIA World Endurance Championship (WEC).

Starting in 2022, the FIA and FIM jointly sanctioned the World Rally-Raid Championship. With the Amaury Sport Organization (ASO) acting as promotor and organizer; the separate cross-country rallying series sanctioned by the FIA and FIM were dissolved and merged into the new World Championship.

FIA World Championships

Organisational structure

General Assembly 
The General Assembly is the Federation's supreme governing body, consisting of representatives from each of the FIA's member associations. According to the FIA's website, the voting member associations can be automobile and touring clubs (mobility), or national sporting authorities (sport). The website further states that there are 244 organisations spread among 146 countries.

Meetings of the General Assembly are usually held once a year, though extraordinary meetings can be convened for urgent matters. The General Assembly has responsibility for amending the FIA's statutes and regulations, approving the annual budget and reports, deciding upon the membership, and electing the officers and members to the Federation's governing bodies.

Presidency 
The head of the FIA and chairman of the General Assembly is the President, a position currently held by Mohammed bin Sulayem. The President coordinates the activities of the Federation and proposes resolutions to the various commissions and committees and also acts as the representative of the FIA to external organisations. They are supported by two Deputy Presidents and several vice-presidents, each for Sport or Mobility, as well as the President of the FIA Senate. The combined presidency is elected to a four-year term by the General Assembly. Presidential candidates must produce an electoral list consisting of their proposed Deputy Presidents, Vice-Presidents for Sport, and the President of the Senate, as well as demonstrate support from a number of member clubs.

World Councils 
The FIA has two World Councils. The Mobility and Automobile Council governs all non-sporting activities, comprising transport policy, road safety, tourism and environmental concerns. The World Motor Sport Council (WMSC) governs all sporting events regulated by the FIA, and writes the regulations for every FIA championship. It also supervises Karting through the Commission Internationale de Karting (CIK). Beneath the WMSC are a number of specialised commissions, which are either focused on individual championships, or general areas such as safety.

Senate 
The FIA Senate generally oversees financial and commercial affairs and general management of the FIA, and can take decisions required between meetings of the relevant committee or World Council.

Administration 
Sport and Mobility each have a Secretary General to head the administrative staff who function as intermediaries for the councils, commissions and committees. A Chief Administration Officer also heads areas supporting the Senate such as commercial, legal, marketing, events and financial.

Commissions 
A number of commissions exist to further activities or aims within specific areas within the FIA's remit. Each may have their own presidency and could be broken down into further specific working groups. Individual members may be from member organisations joined by delegates and representatives from various professions or through a related connection such as being a motorsport competitor for example. Alongside the various Sporting and Mobility Commissions, the International Historical Commission exists for the preservation of historic vehicles.

Sporting Commissions 

 Circuits
 Closed road
 Cross-Country rally
 Drag racing
 Drifting
 Drivers
 Electric and new energy championships
 Endurance
 Esports
 GT
 Hill climb
 Historic motorsport
 Homologation regulations

 International karting
 Land speed records
 Medical
 Off-road
 Rally
 Safety
 Single-seater
 Touring car
 Truck racing
 Volunteers and officials
 Women in motorsport
 World Rally Championship

Committees 
Three sports committees have been established by the World Motorsport Council to help manage and administer certain aspects of motorsport -particularly those of car technical regulations and balance of performance. The established committees are for WEC, GT and Touring Cars. An Ethics committee was also set up in 2012 by the General Assembly.

Judiciary 
The FIA's judicial bodies include the International Tribunal, which exercises disciplinary powers that are not dealt with by the meeting stewards, and the International Court of Appeal. The ICA is the final appeal tribunal for international motor sport, which resolves disputes brought before it by National Sporting Authorities worldwide, or by the President of the FIA. It can also settle non-sporting disputes brought by national motoring organizations affiliated to the FIA.

Presidents

FIA Hall of Fame 

The FIA Hall of Fame honours racing drivers, technicians, and engineers who have greatly contributed to motor racing. It was established by FIA in 2017.

FIA Institute Young Driver Excellence Academy 

In October 2010, the FIA Institute Young Driver Excellence Academy, a new programme to develop young driver talent worldwide, was announced. After a three-day shootout in Melk, Austria, on 6–8 February, twelve drivers were selected.

Regulations and standards 
Many of the Formula Student regulations also refer to FIA standards.

Criticism
In 2007 and 2008 the FIA was criticised on two issues. The 2007 Formula One espionage controversy involved accusations against McLaren, who were accused of stealing technological secrets from Ferrari. Commenting on how the FIA handled the situation, Martin Brundle wrote a column in the Sunday Times titled "Witch-hunt threatens to spoil world title race" in which he accused the FIA of a witch-hunt against McLaren. The World Motor Sport Council responded by issuing a writ against the Sunday Times alleging libel. Brundle responded by saying "I have earned the right to have an opinion", and suggested the writ was a "warning sign to other journalists".

In 2008, accusations surfaced that FIA President Max Mosley was involved in scandalous sexual behaviour. Following a June 2008 decision of the FIA to retain Max Mosley as president, the German branch of the FIA, the ADAC (the largest European motoring body), announced, "We view with regret and incredulity the FIA general assembly's decision in Paris, confirming Max Mosley in office as FIA president". It froze all its activities with the FIA until Max Mosley leaves office. Press reports also claimed that Bernie Ecclestone was investigating creating a rival to the Formula 1 series due to the scandal.

See also

 FIA Prize Giving Ceremony
 List of FIA events
 List of FIA member organisations
 FIA Motorsport Games

References

External links
 
 

 
Auto racing organizations
Formula One
International organizations based in France
International sports organizations
Organizations based in Paris
Sports organizations established in 1904
1904 establishments in Europe
1904 establishments in Asia
1904 establishments in Africa
1904 establishments in North America
1904 establishments in South America
1904 establishments in Oceania
Motorsport governing bodies